The Swastika Laundry was an Irish business founded in 1912, located on Shelbourne Road, Ballsbridge, a district of Dublin. Due to its name and logo being associated with the Nazi Party in Germany, the name was changed in 1939 but their logo endured.

History
The laundry was founded by John W. Brittain (1872–1937) from Manorhamilton, County Leitrim, who was one of the "pioneers of the laundry business in Ireland", having founded the Metropolitan and White Heather Laundries in 1899. He was also the owner of a famous horse called Swastika Rose which was well known "to frequenters of the Royal Dublin's Society's Shows". The use of the Swastika name was as an ancient Indian symbol of good luck: its name originates from the Sanskrit svastika.

The company used electric vans, painted in red with a white swastika on a black roundel, to collect and deliver laundry to customers. The vans were quite ahead of their time.

In 1939, the laundry changed its name to "The Swastika Laundry (1912)" to make clear the distinction between its use of the name and symbol and the more recent adoption of the symbol by the Nazi Party in Germany.

It continued to exist as a separate company until the late 1960s, when it was bought out by the Spring Grove Laundry company, which continued to operate from the same site in Ballsbridge. Nevertheless, the logo and name continued in use until the premises closed in 1987.

Later history of site
Even following the closure of the laundry, its brick chimney, emblazoned with a large white swastika, remained visible for some years from many places in the surrounding area, including the Merrion Road, a main road south from Dublin.

Spring Grove sold the property for redevelopment in the early 21st century during the Dublin property boom of the 1990s and 2000s, as Ballsbridge was by then a popular and exclusive area of Dublin 4. An office development called "The Oval" was constructed on the site. The chimney, which is a protected structure, survives, but the painted swastika does not. The chimney is surrounded by the "oval" of the new development.

Cultural references
In his Irisches Tagebuch (Irish Journal) (1957), the future Nobel Laureate, Heinrich Böll, writes about a year spent living in the west of Ireland in the 1950s. While in Dublin, before heading to County Mayo, he:

See also
 Western use of the swastika in the early 20th century
 Hitlers' Cross, the former name of a restaurant in India with a Nazi motif.
 ASEA, a Swedish Company that had a swastika in its logotype until 1933.
 Carlsberg Group, a Danish brewery company that had a swastika logo until the 1930s.

References

External links
 Brief history of the laundry with a selection of pictures.

Business services companies established in 1912
Companies based in Dublin (city)
Laundry businesses
Laundry
1912 establishments in Ireland
1960s disestablishments in Ireland